Flower In The Rain is a 1972 Hong Kong romantic drama film directed by Kim Soo-Yong.

Plot 
A rich girl and her boyfriend run off to Singapore after her father objects to their relationship. Her boyfriend is injured and they run short of money. Unable to find a job, she works in a nightclub and becomes one of the most sought after girls. Her boss rapes her when she decides to quit. Her boyfriend finds out and a fight ensues, in which the boss is killed. In grief, she kills herself by falling off a cliff.

Cast
Lily Ho Li Li
Ling Yun
James Nam
Tsang Choh
Chen Yen-yen
Goo Man Chung
Lam Fung
Chu Gam
Hsu Yu
Lui Hung

References

1972 films
1970s Mandarin-language films
1972 romantic drama films
Hong Kong romantic drama films
1970s Hong Kong films